Holly Aprile (born December 23, 1969) is an American, former collegiate All-American, softball pitcher and current head coach for Louisville. She played college softball at the utility position for the UMass Minutewomen from 1989–1992 in the Atlantic 10 Conference, where she was eventually named Newcomer of the Year, Player of the Year and Pitcher of the Year over her career, in addition to being recognized as a four-time All-Conference honoree. She also led the team to their first appearance at the 1992 Women's College World Series, finishing in the semifinals. Aprile is also a UMass Hall of Fame inductee.

Coaching career

Pittsburgh

Louisville
On July 8, 2018, Holly Aprile was announced as the new head coach of the Louisville softball program.

Career Statistics

Head coaching record

College

External links

References

Living people
Female sports coaches
American softball coaches
UMass Minutewomen softball players
Softball players from New York (state)
Eastern Illinois Panthers softball coaches
South Carolina Gamecocks softball coaches
Pittsburgh Panthers softball coaches
Louisville Cardinals softball coaches
1969 births